Alexander Ivanovich Molev  (born 1961) is a Russian-Australian mathematician.

He completed his Ph.D. in 1986 under the supervision of Alexandre Kirillov at Moscow State University. He was awarded the Australian Mathematical Society Medal in 2001.

Amongst other things, he has worked on Yangians and Lie algebras.

He is currently a Professor in the School of Mathematics and Statistics, Faculty of Science, University of Sydney.

Bibliography
 Alexander Molev, Yangians and classical Lie algebras, Mathematical Surveys and Monographs, 143. American Mathematical Society, Providence, RI, 2007. xviii+400 pp.  
 Alexander Molev, Sugawara Operators for Classical Lie Algebras, Mathematical Surveys and Monographs, 229. American Mathematical Society, Providence, RI, 2018 304 pp.

External links
 University home page

Australian mathematicians
Russian mathematicians
Living people
1961 births
Academic staff of the University of Sydney

Australian people of Russian descent